The Recorder's Court, in Detroit, Michigan was a state court of limited jurisdiction which had, for most of its history, exclusive jurisdiction over traffic and ordinance matters, and over all felony cases committed in the City of Detroit. Its jurisdiction did not extend to civil suits.

It was merged into the Wayne County Circuit Court, the general jurisdiction court in Wayne County, following the pattern of the rest of the state of Michigan in October 1997.

History

Origin
It traces its roots to the Mayor's Court in Detroit, formed in 1824.  To clarify, Detroit Recorders' Court was one of the oldest courts of record in the U.S.A.

This municipal court probably owed its name to the fact that from 1827 until 1857, the official name of the City of Detroit was "The Mayor, Recorder and Alderman of Detroit." A "Recorder" is the title of a judicial officer in England and Wales and some other common law jurisdictions, such as the former office "Recorder of New York City".

Sweet family murder trials
Within its 173-year history, the Ossian Sweet family murder trials—defended by Clarence Darrow and presided over by Judge Frank Murphy (who became Mayor of Detroit, Governor of Michigan, the last Governor-General of the Philippines and the first High Commissioner of the Philippines, United States Attorney General, and United States Supreme Court Associate Justice) is arguably the most famous case tried there.

The trials are memorialized in two official Michigan Historical Markers:
 Frank Murphy
 Dr. Ossian Sweet / Home

Additionally, there is a "Michigan Legal Milestones". plaque (erected by the State Bar of Michigan in the first floor of the Frank Murphy Hall of Justice in Detroit.

Kevin Boyle's chronicle, Arc of Justice: A Saga of Race, Civil Rights, and Murder in the Jazz Age was adapted into a play.  Mr. Boyle was honored by the Detroit City Council for The Sweet Trials.  *The Sweet Trials: Malice Aforethought is a play written by Arthur Beer, based on the trials of Ossian and Henry Sweet, and derived from Kevin Boyle's Arc of Justice.

Merger into Wayne County Circuit Court
The merger of the Recorder's court and Wayne County (Third Judicial) Circuit Court was not without controversy.  It was made pursuant to a 1997 state law which also consolidated the state's probate courts into a family court, a far less controversial change.  A lawsuit brought by Richard Kuhn opposed the merger, but did not prevail.

Prior to the merger, "judges of Recorder's Court were elected from Detroit, so unsurprisingly, most of them were African-American. Then Detroit Recorder's Court was abolished — or rather, it was merged with Wayne County Circuit Court. The Recorder's Court judges became Circuit Court judges, and have to run for re-election in Wayne County as a whole, which is predominantly white."

At the time of its merger, and now as reconfigured as a part of the Wayne County Circuit Court, the court has been housed in the Frank Murphy Hall of Justice.

Notable judges

 George Crockett Jr., later a US Congressional Representative
 George Crockett III
 Gershwin A. Drain (born 1949), later a US federal judge
 Frank Murphy, later mayor of Detroit, governor of Michigan, attorney general of the United States, and Associate Justice of the United States Supreme Court
 John R. Murphy

Notes

Further reading
 Boyle, Kevin, Arc of Justice: A Saga of Race, Civil Rights, and Murder in the Jazz Age, chronicles Sweet's life and trial, and was awarded the 2004 National Book Award for Non-Fiction. ; 

Michigan state courts
Defunct state courts of the United States
Legal history of Michigan
Detroit
1824 establishments in Michigan Territory
1997 disestablishments in Michigan
Courts and tribunals established in 1824
Courts and tribunals established in 1997